Lekhnath was a municipality in Kaski District in the Gandaki Province of northern-central Nepal, about 180 km west of Kathmandu. It has now been merged into Pokhara sub-metropolitan city to form Pokhara metropolis. Pokhara Valley was politically divided between Pokhara city and Lekhnath which occupied the eastern half of the valley. 
There were 18 wards in total in Lekhnath municipality before the merger, with a VDC Bharat Pokhari that had been added at a later stage.

Population 
Total population of Lekhnath was 71,434 per 2011 census.  Composition of the population was 86% Hindu, 8% Buddhist and 6% others.　According to another statistics by the Population Census (C), Lekhnath has seen population changes from 30,107 as of 22 June 1991 contrasted to 41,369 (28 May 2001 per Population Census (Cf)) and 59,498 (22 June 2011 per Population Census (Cf)).

Etymology 
Lekhnath, or literally meaning novelist in Nepali language, was named after the famous Nepali poet Lekhnath Paudyal (1885–1966), who was born at Arghaun Archale, or ward No.6 (before the merger) of Lekhnath Municipality. The city was also entitled as the garden city of seven lakes.

Geology 
Those seven lakes are Begnas, Rupa, Khaste, Depang, Maidi, Neureni and Gunde. Except Begnas and Rupa most of the other lakes are little known to the outsiders.

Hiking routes 
Lekhnath possesses many terrains and mountain view sites. It is growing into a popular destination for hikers because of many beautiful routes through the hills with views of multiple lakes and majestic himalayas at the same time. Lekhanth is the place from where you can catch the view of whole Annapurna range including Machhapuchhre and Dhaulagiri.

Gagangaunda, Shishuwa, Lekhnath chok, Janatako Chautara, Satmuhane, Budhibazar, Dhungepatan, Khudi, Talchok are some big and notable places of Lekhnath.

Media 
To promote local culture Lekhnath has one FM radio station Radio Lekhnath 106.6 MHz Which is a Community radio Station. To update Lekhnath dwellers and diasporas websites Cityof7lakes.com, Lekhnathcity.com and Lekhnath.com are created.

Footnotes

Notes

References

External links 
 7 Lakes in Lekhnath
 the 2nd Begnas Fish Festival at Baishakh, 17-19, 2073B.S.

Populated places in Kaski District
Nepal municipalities established in 1997
Former municipalities of Nepal